The Jakarta Declaration on Leading Health Promotion into the 21st Century is the name of an international agreement that was signed at the World Health Organization's 1997 Fourth International Conference on Health Promotion held in Jakarta. The declaration reiterated the importance of the agreements made in the Ottawa Charter for Health Promotion, and added emphasis to certain aspects of health promotion.

About the Declaration
The Jakarta Declaration included the following five "priorities for health promotion in the 21st century":
1. "Promote social responsibility for health"
2. "Increase investments for health development"
3. "Consolidate and expand partnerships for health"
4. "increase community capacity and empower the individual"
5. "Secure an infrastructure for health promotion"

The declaration recognizes that":
 Participation is necessary for change.
 Health literacy is essential for participation - emphasizes the need for access to education and information and hence, the empowerment of individuals and communities.
 Combinations of five strategies for health promotion -- "build healthy public policy", "create supportive environments", "strengthen community action", "develop personal skills", and "reorient health services"—are more effective than "single-track approaches".

Promotion of the Declaration
In the United Kingdom, the central message of the Jakarta declaration is similar to the government's current health policy. That is the emphasis on infrastructure and investment, with the hope of empowering the service user with choice.

See also 
 Health promotion
 Ottawa Charter for Health Promotion
 Bangkok Charter for Health Promotion in a Globalized World
 Healthy city
 Alliance for Healthy Cities
 Primary health care
 Public health
 World Health Organization

References

Further reading
 Ewles L, Simnett I (2003) Promoting health: a practical guide.  London: Baillière Tindall. 5th ed. .

Health promotion
World Health Organization